River Lily is a small stream that flows through Knutsford, England.  It has been claimed that it is the smallest river in Europe. It enters Tatton Mere by running under an unmade road.

External links

Lily
Knutsford
2Lily